The Bayer designations m Puppis and M Puppis are distinct. Due to technical limitations, both designations link here. For the star

m Puppis, see PU Puppis
M Puppis, see HD 57197

Puppis, m
Puppis